The following is a list of blues rock musicians.

Blues rock is a subgenre of rock which developed in the late-1960s and which emphasizes the traditional, three-chord blues song and instrumental improvisation. The first original blues rock artists such as Cream, the Paul Butterfield Blues Band and Canned Heat actually borrowed the idea of combining an instrumental combo with loud amplification from rock and roll, and also attempted to play long, involved improvisations which were commonplace on jazz records and live blues shows. As blues rock gained popularity, bands that followed immediately were louder and more riff-oriented, giving birth to both heavy metal and Southern rock, which both used basic blues riffs and featured extended solos. In the early 1970s, the lines between blues rock and hard rock were barely visible, as bands including ZZ Top began recording rock-oriented albums that tended to obscure their blues roots. However, blues rock soon distinguished itself from hard rock and acts continued to play or rewrite blues standards, as well as write their own songs in the same idiom. In the 1980s and 1990s, blues rock was more roots-oriented than in the 1960s and 1970s, even when artists such as the Fabulous Thunderbirds and Stevie Ray Vaughan flirted with rock stardom.

Solo artists are listed alphabetically by last name, and groups are listed alphabetically by the first letter (not including the prefix "the", "a" or "an").

A

AC/DC
Aerosmith
Jim Allchin
Bernard Allison
The Allman Brothers Band
Devon Allman
Duane Allman
Gregg Allman
American Blues
Jake Andrews
The Animals
The Answer
Arc Angels
The Ardells
Gwyn Ashton
Atomic Rooster
The Aynsley Dunbar Retaliation

B

Bachman–Turner Overdrive
Back Door Slam
Bad Company
Ginger Baker
Long John Baldry
Band of Skulls
The Barons
Lou Ann Barton
Jeff Beck
Duster Bennett
Beware of Darkness
Big Brother and the Holding Company
Billy Thorpe & the Aztecs
Elvin Bishop
The Black Crowes
The Black Keys
Blind Faith
Blodwyn Pig
Mike Bloomfield
Blue Cheer
The Blue Van
The Blues Band
The Blues Project
Blues Traveler
Joe Bonamassa
Graham Bond
Deborah Bonham
Jean-Paul Bourelly
Box of Frogs
Doyle Bramhall II
The Brew
Roy Buchanan
Paul Butterfield
Butts Band

C

Cactus
J. J. Cale
Canned Heat
Captain Beefheart
Tommy Castro
Nathan Cavaleri
Yavuz Çetin
Sean Chambers
Chickasaw Mudd Puppies
Chicken Shack
Chris Robinson Brotherhood
Cinderella
Eric Clapton
Gary Clark, Jr.
Climax Blues Band
Clutch
Joe Cocker
Colin Dussault's Blues Project
Jamie N Commons
Joanna Connor
Ry Cooder
Kevin Coyne
Papa John Creach
Cream
Creedence Clearwater Revival
Cuby + Blizzards
Shannon Curfman

D

The Dead Weather
Deap Vally
Deep Purple
Derek and the Dominos
The Derek Trucks Band
Rick Derringer
Dire Straits
The Doors
Double Trouble
Chris Duarte

E

Electric Flag
Elf
The Elvin Bishop Group
Endless Boogie

F

The Fabulous Thunderbirds
Faces
Fleetwood Mac
Foghat
Guy Forsyth
Free
Dana Fuchs

G

Eric Gales
Rory Gallagher
Lowell George
David Gerald
Gov't Mule
Grace Potter and the Nocturnals
Grand Funk Railroad
Grateful Dead
Great White
Peter Green
The Greenhornes
The Groundhogs
Gugun Blues Shelter
Guns N' Roses

H

The Hamsters
Don "Sugarcane" Harris
Beth Hart
Warren Haynes
Jeff Healey
Heartless Bastards
Jimi Hendrix
Taylor Hicks
Dave Hole
Honeytribe
Hoodoo Rhythm Devils
Hot Tuna
House of Freaks
Humble Pie

J

The J. Geils Band
Colin James
JD & The Straight Shot
Jeff Beck Group
Jethro Tull
The Jimi Hendrix Experience
John Mayer Trio
Jon Spencer Blues Explosion
Janis Joplin
John Mayall & the Bluesbreakers
Eric Johnson
Josefus
Juicy Lucy

K

Danny Kalb
Keef Hartley Band
Kill It Kid
B.B. King
Freddie King
King King
Al Kooper
Alexis Korner

L

Jonny Lang
Led Zeppelin
Alvin Lee
Left Lane Cruiser
Aynsley Lister
Little Feat
Nils Lofgren
Los Lonely Boys
Love Sculpture
Lynyrd Skynyrd

M

Lonnie Mack
Wolf Mail
Manal
Harvey Mandel
John Mayall
John Mayer
Delbert McClinton
Tony McPhee
Buddy Miles
Steve Miller
Molly Hatchet
Gary Moore
Ian Moore
Mike Morgan
Mother Superior
Mountain
Moving Sidewalks
Muddy Waters
The Muggs
Mythology

N

The Neats
The Norman Beaker Band
North Mississippi Allstars
The Numbers Band

O

Omar & the Howlers
Joan Osborne

P

Pacific Gas & Electric
The Pack A.D.
Jimmy Page
Robert Palmer (singer)
The Peter Parcek 3
The Paul Butterfield Blues Band
Popa Chubby
Ana Popović
Duffy Power
Tom Principato
Pure Food and Drug Act

R

The Raconteurs
Radio Moscow
Bonnie Raitt
The Record Company
Chris Rea
The Red Devils
Keith Richards
Rising Sons
Rival Sons
Robert Bradley's Blackwater Surprise
Paul Rodgers
The Rolling Stones
Rose Hill Drive
Rose Tattoo
The Rounders
Royal Southern Brotherhood

S

Saint Lu
Santana
Eric Sardinas
Savoy Brown
Matt Schofield
Charlie Sexton
The Sheepdogs
Kenny Wayne Shepherd
Skid Row
The Snowdroppers
Soledad Brothers
Soulmate
Spooky Tooth
Status Quo
Steamhammer
The Steepwater Band
The Stone Foxes
Storyville
The Strypes

T

Taste
Tedeschi Trucks Band
Ten Years After
Jimmy Thackery
Them
Thin Lizzy
George Thorogood
Pat Travers
Treat Her Right
Triggerfinger
Walter Trout
Robin Trower
Derek Trucks
Duke Tumatoe

V

Javier Vargas
Jimmie Vaughan
Stevie Ray Vaughan

W

Joe Walsh
The Wanton Bishops
Warumpi Band
Welshly Arms
When Rivers Meet
Jack White
Snowy White
The White Stripes
Whitesnake
Chris Whitley
David Wilcox
Edgar Winter
Johnny Winter
Steve Winwood
Wishbone Ash
Ronnie Wood

Y
The Yardbirds

Z

Zephyr
ZZ Top

References

Bibliography

Musicians
 
Rock
Blues rock